FFG may refer to:
 Austrian Research Promotion Agency, an Austrian government agency
 Fairmount Food Group, an American food industrial company
 Fallen from Grace, an album by American hip hop group Insane Poetry
 Fantasy Flight Games, an American game company
 FBL Financial Group, an American financial services holding company
 Fianna Fáil and Fine Gael together, historically the two largest political parties in Ireland
 First Floor Gallery Harare, a contemporary art gallery based in Harare, Zimbabwe
 Flensburger Fahrzeugbau, a German vehicle manufacturer
 Flora and Fauna Guarantee Act 1988, Victoria, Australia
 Friderico-Francisceum-Gymnasium, a German secondary school
 Friedberg station, in Germany
 French Federation of Go,
 Fur-Fish-Game, an American outdoors magazine
 Fundamental Fysiks Group, an American quantum mysticism group
 Fukuoka Financial Group, a Japanese financial company
 Guided missile frigate
 FFg, a grade of black powder used in medium and small-bore firearms